Flosstradamus is the stage name of American DJ and musician Curt Cameruci. From 2007 until 2016, Flosstradamus consisted of Cameruci and Josh Young from Chicago. The duo announced they would both be pursuing solo careers, with Cameruci to continue using Flosstradamus as a stage name. Cameruci is also known as Autobot and Young is also known as J2K and YehMe2. Flosstradamus is known for being one of the early pioneers of the trap genre, made popular by their remix of Major Lazer's hit single "Original Don".

Flosstradamus, as a duo, have worked alongside artists including Kid Sister (Young's sister), Diplo, Three 6 Mafia's Juicy J, The Cool Kids, and A-Trak. They played at many college campuses such as Wellesley College, Drexel University (alongside Waka Flocka Flame), Northwestern University, Carnegie Mellon University (playing alongside RJD2), Middlebury College, Columbia University, and UC Riverside. They have additionally appeared on Late Night with Jimmy Fallon, and the Nick Jr. program Yo Gabba Gabba!.

Career
In April 2006, Flosstradamus, as a duo, were included in URB's annual "Next 100". In addition, during the summer of 2007 they embarked on an international tour with Chromeo, dubbed the "Fancy Footwork Tour". Autobot is also active in the Serato Scratch Live community making his Flossy FX sampler available online to the masses via their MySpace page. In 2014, at SXSW Flosstradamus set up a guerrilla WiFi network titled PLURNTNET to distribute a new track titled "Hdygrlz Anthm". Using social media the duo pointed fans to the PLURTNET via geotagged posts at various locations around Austin. Users could sign on and download or stream the track.

On July 29, 2016, they released their single 'Came Up' with FKi 1st, graves and featuring Post Malone and Key!. In December 2016, Young announced Flosstradamus were splitting and he will pursue a solo career. Young's solo project soon adopted the name YehMe2. Cameruci will continue with the name Flosstradamus as a solo act. In March 2017 he released the single "Back Again", which featured Waka Flocka Flame and Mayhem through Ultra Music. They have also partnered with Dillon Francis to form the touring and live performance group Dillstradamus.

Discography

As a duo

Extended plays
2011: Jubilation (Fool's Gold Records)
2012: Total Recall (Mad Decent / Jeffrees)
2012: Jubilation 2.0 (Fool's Gold Records)
2012: XO
2013 Nomads (with DJ Sliink)
2014 Wake & Bake (with Travis Porter)
2014 Plurnt
2015 Soundclash (Ultra Records / Fool's Gold Records)
2015 Hdynation Radio (Ultra Records)

Mixtapes
2007: Scion Audio/Visual CD Sampler V. 17 (Vice Records)
2009: Are You In?: Nike+ Original Run

Singles
2009: "Big Bills" featuring Caroline Polachek (Green Label)
2013: "Assquake"
2013: "Look at the Sky"
2013: "Hood Fantasy"
2013: "Pillz" (with Yellow Claw and Green Velvet)
2013: "Mosh Pit" (with Casino)
2014: "Drop Top" (with Travis Porter)
2014: "TTU (Too Turnt Up)" (with Waka Flocka Flame)
2014: "Rebound" (with Elkka)
2015: "Prison Riot" (with GTA and Lil Jon)
2015: "Soundclash" (with TroyBoi)
2016: "Came Up" (with FKi 1st, graves, Post Malone and Key)
2017: "Back Again" (with Mayhem and Waka Flocka Flame)
2017: "How You Gon' Do That" (with Cara)
2017: "Tern It Up" (with Dillon Francis)
2018: "2 Much" (with 24hrs)
2018: "MVP" (with Smokepurpp)
2018: "Guava" (with Rawtek)
2018: "ID" (with Boombox Cartel)
2019: "G.O.D. (Grind or Die)" (with Blvk Jvck featuring Leat'eq)
2019: "Bounce Back" (with Megatone)
2020: "So Far" (with Nonsens)

Production
2011: Toddla T featuring J2K - "Take It Back" 
2012: Iggy Azalea featuring Juicy J - "Flexin & Finessin"
2012: Mykki Blanco - "YungRhymeAssassin"

Soundtracks
2015: Need for Speed - "Don't Trip"

Remixes
 2012: Sub Focus - Tidal Wave (Flosstradamus Remix)
 2013: Flux Pavilion featuring Childish Gambino - Do or Die (Flosstradamus Remix)
 2014: Young Thug - Stoner (Flosstradamus Remix)
 2014: Steve Aoki featuring Waka Flocka Flame - Rage the Night Away (Flosstradamus Remix)
 2015: O.T. Genasis - CoCo (Flosstradamus Remix)
 2015: Rihanna - Bitch Better Have My Money (Flosstradamus Remix)
 2015: Major Lazer featuring Bruno Mars, Tyga and Mystic - Bubble Butt (Flosstradamus Remix)
 2015: Fetty Wap featuring Drake - My Way (Flosstradamus and 4B Remix)
 2016: Dizzee Rascal and Calvin Harris - Hype (Flosstradamus Remix)
 2019: Nghtmre featuring ASAP Ferg - Redlight (Flosstradamus Remix)

In popular culture 
The musician collaborated with Hemper to create his own smoking accessory box, typically used to consume marijuana. Other musicians such as Ty Dolla $ign, Fetty Wap, and 2Chainz did the same along with Flosstradramus.

References

External links
 Official website
 Flosstradamus on the Diplo & Friends show

American electronic musicians
People from Chicago
American DJs
Living people
Electronic dance music DJs
Trap musicians (EDM)
Year of birth missing (living people)